The Raleigh Firebirds are an American professional basketball team based in Raleigh, North Carolina, and a member of The Basketball League (TBL). For the 2019 season, their home games were played at Southeast Raleigh Magnet High School and Robert Brickey served as its head coach.Since then, the Firebirds have played ever year, with a spanning season from March to June. During their first inaugural season, the team went 13-1 at home, and reached the TBL Eastern Conference Finals. The Firebirds also had the number one overall pick in the 2019 TBL Draft, and selected Julian Harris. Harris would win Rookie of the Year, and go on to play basketball overseas.

History
On February 25, 2018, Dave Magley, owner of The Basketball League (TBL), stated that Raleigh, North Carolina, was approved as a basketball franchise for the upcoming 2019 season. On July 27, 2018, the team was announced as the Raleigh Firebirds. Raleigh previously hosted the Raleigh Cougars from 1997 to 1999 in the United States Basketball League.

The Firebirds first season was played during 2019, and they traveled all over the country. During the 14 games they played at home, the team went 13-1, and eventually lost in the TBL Eastern Conference Finals. They were four points from playing in the TBL Finals.

Current roster

References

External links
Raleigh Firebirds website

Basketball teams in North Carolina
The Basketball League teams
2018 establishments in North Carolina
Basketball teams established in 2018
Basketball in Raleigh, North Carolina